The Town and Country Planning (Local Development) (England) Regulations 2004 are a statutory instrument that sets out the specific local development documents which local planning authorities in England are required to prepare and how that should be done.

Essentially the Act gives detail to the British Government's revisions to the planning system by means of the Planning and Compulsory Purchase Act 2004.

It came into force on 28 September 2004.

External links
The Town and Country Planning (Local Development) (England) Regulations 2004 (S.I. 2004/2204)

Housing in England
United Kingdom planning law
2004 in British law
2004 in England
Statutory Instruments of the United Kingdom
Town and country planning in England
English property law